Takam Tallum (born 15 July 1995) is an Indian cricketer. He made his first-class debut on 19 January 2020, for Arunachal Pradesh in the 2019–20 Ranji Trophy. He made his Twenty20 debut on 11 January 2021, for Arunachal Pradesh in the 2020–21 Syed Mushtaq Ali Trophy.

References

External links
 

1995 births
Living people
Indian cricketers
Arunachal Pradesh cricketers
Place of birth missing (living people)